Peter Owen is a makeup artist who won at the 74th Academy Awards in the category of Best Makeup for the film The Lord of the Rings: The Fellowship of the Ring. He shared his win with Richard Taylor.

Selected filmography

 The Dark Crystal (1982)
 Dangerous Liaisons (1988)
 Wolf (1994)
 Marvin's Room (1996)
 The Peacemaker (1997)
 A Thousand Acres (1997)
 Sleepy Hollow (1999)
 Shadow of the Vampire (2000)
 The Lord of the Rings: The Fellowship of the Ring (2001)
 Zoolander (2001)
 The Lord of the Rings: The Two Towers (2002)
 The Lord of the Rings: The Return of the King (2003)
 Charlie and the Chocolate Factory (2005)
 Clash of the Titans (2010)

References

External links

Best Makeup Academy Award winners
Best Makeup BAFTA Award winners
Living people
Make-up artists
Year of birth missing (living people)